Dori Ghezzi (born 30 March 1946) is an Italian singer who was active as a recording artist between 1966 and 1989. In the 1970s, Ghezzi worked mainly in a duo with American singer Wess, and the couple represented Italy in the 1975 Eurovision Song Contest.

Early career 
Ghezzi was born in Lentate sul Seveso, in the province of Monza and Brianza.

After winning a regional song festival in 1966, Ghezzi was offered a recording contract with Milan-based record label Durium. In the following years, she released several successful singles including "Vivere per vivere" and "Casatschock".  Ghezzi made her first appearance in the San Remo Festival in 1970, performing "Occhi a mandorla", a duet with Rossano, but the song failed to qualify for the final. In the period 1970–72, Ghezzi mainly recorded Italian cover versions of popular French and British songs of the time.

With Wess 
In 1972, Ghezzi's fellow Durium recording artist Wess suggested that the pair team up as a duo to record "Voglio stare con te", a version of British hit "United We Stand". This proved a big chart success, and Durium proposed that Wess and Ghezzi become a regular recording partnership. Ghezzi had a solo album ready for release in 1973, which, along with a single "Adamo ed Eva", would be her last solo recording venture of the 1970s. Thereafter, Wess and Ghezzi became a successful and prolific duo, releasing seven albums and many singles before they parted ways in 1979. They took part in San Remo twice, coming sixth in 1973 ("Tu nella mia vita") and second in 1976 ("Come stai, con chi sei?").

Eurovision Song Contest 
In 1975, Wess and Ghezzi were chosen by broadcaster RAI to be Italy's representatives at that year's Eurovision Song Contest with the song "Era" ("It Was"). They went forward to the 20th Eurovision, held on 22 March in Stockholm, where "Era", an unusual song for Eurovision at the time, proved different enough to impress the voting juries and placed third in a field of 19.

Kidnapping 
In 1974 Ghezzi became the partner of singer Fabrizio De André and the couple had set up home in Sardinia, where Ghezzi had given birth to a daughter in 1977. On the evening of 27 August 1979, Ghezzi and De André were kidnapped by members of Sardinia's Anonima sequestri, and were held captive in the Supramonte mountains for almost four months before being released (Ghezzi on 21 December, De André the following day) on payment of a ransom, reportedly in the region of 500 million lire, believed to have been raised by De André's family. The pair subsequently stated that they had been well-treated by their captors; when the kidnappers were apprehended and put on trial, De André would show understanding and sympathy in his testimony.

1980s 
Following the split from Wess, Ghezzi resumed her solo career in 1980 with the release of the album Mamadodori, dedicated to her daughter. Piccole donne followed in 1983 and the song "Margherita non-lo sa" earned Ghezzi third place at that year's San Remo.  1987 saw the album Velluti e carte vetrate and 14th place at San Remo with "E non-si finisce mai", while her last album Il cuore delle donne, the title track of which became Ghezzi's final San Remo entry (placing 16th), came in 1989. Ghezzi and De André married on 7 December 1989.

Retirement 
Ghezzi retired from her singing career on medical advice in 1990, having developed a serious problem with her vocal cords, and has since made only infrequent and secondary contributions to recordings by other artists. De André died of lung cancer in 1999 and Ghezzi has since dedicated herself to preserving and promoting his artistic heritage. She is the president of the Fondazione Fabrizio De André.

Sanremo Music Festival entries 
1970: "Occhi a mandorla" (with Rossano) – Semi-final
1973: "Tu nella mia vita" (with Wess) – 6th
1976: "Come stai, con chi sei?" (with Wess) – 2nd
1983: "Margherita non-lo sa" – 3rd
1987: "E non-si finisce mai" – 14th
1989: "Il cuore delle donne" – 16th

Albums discography 
Solo
1973: Dori Ghezzi
1980: Mamadodori
1983: Piccolo donne
1987: Velluti e carte vetrate
1989: Il cuore delle donne
With Wess
1973: Wess & Dori Ghezzi
1974: Un corpo e un'anima
1975: Terzo album
1976: Amore bellissimo
1976: I nostri successi
1977: Insieme
1979: In due
2000: Tu nella mia vita

See also
List of kidnappings
List of solved missing person cases

References

External links 
 Fondazione Fabrizio De André 

1946 births
1970s missing person cases
Eurovision Song Contest entrants for Italy
Eurovision Song Contest entrants of 1975
Formerly missing people
Italian women singers
Kidnapped Italian people
Living people
Missing person cases in Italy
People from the Province of Monza e Brianza